The National Foreign Exchange Association is a non-commercial association of commercial banks, currency exchanges, brokerage firms, and others dedicated to the development and improvement of a high standard foreign exchange market and money market in Russia. Founded in Moscow in 1999, the association had 74 members as of 2005. Among other activities, the National Foreign Exchange Association coordinates with the Bank of Russia in daily setting the Russian Overnight Index Average (Ruonia), which operates similarly to the European Eonia.

In 2010, members of the National Monetary Association were 69 financial organizations, including
Commercial banks: 
ABN AMRO
Alfa-Bank
Bank of Moscow
Gazprombank
ING-Eurasia and others
JPMorgan Chase
Raiffeisen Zentralbank
Sberbank of Russia
VEB.RF
VTB Bank
Currency exchanges, including MICEX
Brokerage firms, bank associations and other organizations.

References

External links

Financial services companies of Russia
Companies based in Moscow